The 2010 South Lakeland District Council election took place on 6 May 2010 to elect members of South Lakeland District Council in Cumbria, England. One third of the council was up for election and the Liberal Democrats stayed in overall control of the council.

After the election, the composition of the council was:
Liberal Democrat 34
Conservative 16
Labour 1

Background
Before the election the Liberal Democrats had controlled the council since winning a majority at the 2006 election. Going into the 2010 election they held 36 seats, compared to 14 for the Conservatives and 1 seat for the Labour Party.

18 seats were being contested in the election with the Liberal Democrats defending all of them.

Election result
The results saw the Liberal Democrats maintain their majority on the council despite losing 2 seats to the Conservatives. The Conservatives gains came in the seats of Mid Furness and Staveley-in-Cartmel, and left the Liberal Democrats on 34 seats, compared to 16 for the Conservatives. Overall turnout in the election was 72.25%, due to the election being held at the same time as the general election.

Ward results

Brendan Jameson was a sitting councillor for Kendal Parks ward.

Jonathan Brook was a sitting councillor for Kendal Mintsfeet ward.

By-Elections

References

2010
2010 English local elections
May 2010 events in the United Kingdom
2010s in Cumbria